Gastón Darío Bojanich (born 23 April 1985) is an Argentine professional footballer who plays as a centre-back for Temperley.

Career
Bojanich spent a period of his youth career in the system of San Lorenzo. However, he started off his senior career in Primera C Metropolitana with General Lamadrid in 2004. He departed the club four years later, following seven goals in one hundred and eight matches. Bojanich joined fellow Primera C Metropolitana team Barracas Central in 2009. He won promotion to Primera B Metropolitana in the 2010–11 season. Bojanich netted seven goals in three seasons in the third tier. On 30 June 2014, Primera B Nacional side Temperley signed Bojanich. His spell with Temperley lasted three years, yielding eighty-seven appearances.

He departed Temperley in 2017, subsequently having a short five-month spell with Tigre. In January 2018, Argentinos Juniors of the Primera División became the fifth senior club of Bojanich's career. He scored his first goal in his third appearance, versus Atlético Tucumán on 17 February. After spending the 2019–20 season back with Barracas Central, now of Primera B Nacional, Bojanich headed to Nueva Chicago in August 2020.

Career statistics
.

Honours
Barracas Central
Primera C Metropolitana: 2009–10

References

External links

1985 births
Living people
Footballers from Buenos Aires
Argentine footballers
Association football defenders
Primera C Metropolitana players
Primera B Metropolitana players
Primera Nacional players
Argentine Primera División players
General Lamadrid footballers
Barracas Central players
Club Atlético Temperley footballers
Club Atlético Tigre footballers
Argentinos Juniors footballers
Nueva Chicago footballers